Marcin Bochynek (born 18 September 1942) is a Polish football player and coach.

Playing career
Bochynek was born in Zabrze, Poland. He played for Górnik Zabrze, Zawisza Bydgoszcz and Stal Rzeszów.

Coaching career
Bochynek managed Górnik Knurów, Górnik Zabrze, AE Larissa, Odra Wodzisław, Dyskobolia Grodzisk Wielkopolski, Odra Opole and Piast Gliwice.

References

1942 births
Living people
Sportspeople from Zabrze
Polish footballers
Górnik Zabrze players
Zawisza Bydgoszcz players
Stal Rzeszów players
Polish football managers
Górnik Zabrze managers
Athlitiki Enosi Larissa F.C. managers
Odra Wodzisław Śląski managers
Dyskobolia Grodzisk Wielkopolski managers
Odra Opole managers
Piast Gliwice managers
Association footballers not categorized by position